The women's 500 metres race of the 2013 World Single Distance Speed Skating Championships was held on 24 March at 15:00 and 16:28 local time.

Results

References

Women 00500
World